Call name is the given name a person is commonly referred to, for example, in the case of multiple given names.

Call name may also refer to:

Call sign, a unique designation for a transmitter station
In dog breeding, "call name" is a casual name for the animal, as distinguished from the registered name

See also
 Call by name, an evaluation strategy used in computer programming